Pop of the Morning was an American morning talk show that aired on E! on January 6 to March 12, 2020.

Premise
The show covered pop culture and celebrity news and features celebrity interviews.

Cast
The show was hosted by Lilliana Vazquez, Scott Tweedie and Victor Cruz.

Production
The show premiered on January 6, 2020. On March 13, 2020, it was announced that effective immediately, the show would go on hiatus due to the COVID-19 pandemic. On August 5, 2020, E! canceled all three New York-based shows, along with E! News and In The Room.

References

2020 American television series debuts
2020 American television series endings
2020s American television talk shows
E! original programming
English-language television shows
Television productions cancelled due to the COVID-19 pandemic